Pterotopteryx lonicericola is a moth of the family Alucitidae. It is found in Russia, as well as Tajikistan.

The larvae have been reported feeding on Lonicera korolkowii and Lonicera nummulariifolia.

References

Moths described in 1978
Alucitidae